The first season of the American fantasy television series The Lord of the Rings: The Rings of Power is based on the novel The Lord of the Rings and its appendices by J. R. R. Tolkien. Set in the Second Age of Middle-earth, thousands of years before Tolkien's The Hobbit and The Lord of the Rings, it depicts the re-emergence of evil in Middle-earth. The season was produced by Amazon Studios in association with New Line Cinema and in consultation with the Tolkien Estate. J. D. Payne and Patrick McKay served as showrunners.

Amazon bought the television rights to The Lord of the Rings in November 2017 and made a multi-season commitment for a new series. Payne and McKay were set to develop it in July 2018, and a large international cast was hired. Filming was confirmed to take place in New Zealand, where Peter Jackson's The Lord of the Rings and The Hobbit film trilogies were made, after negotiations between Amazon and the New Zealand government. The production intended to evoke the films with similar production design, and Wētā Workshop returned to provide prosthetics. Filming began in February 2020, but was placed on hold in March due to the COVID-19 pandemic. Production resumed in September and wrapped in August 2021, taking place in Auckland and on location around New Zealand. J. A. Bayona, Wayne Che Yip, and Charlotte Brändström directed episodes of the season. Post-production took place in New Zealand until June 2022, and Wētā FX returned from the films as one of the visual effects vendors. Bear McCreary spent a year composing the original score.

The season premiered on the streaming service Amazon Prime Video on September 1, 2022, with its first two episodes. This followed an extensive marketing campaign that attempted to win over dissatisfied Tolkien fans. The rest of the eight-episode run was released weekly until October 14. Amazon said the season was the most-watched of any Prime Video original series, and third-party analytics companies also estimated its viewership to be high. Its performance was widely compared to the concurrent fantasy series House of the Dragon. The season received generally positive reviews from critics, with praise for its plot, cinematography, visuals, and musical score, but criticism for its pacing. Responses from audiences, including vocal Tolkien fans, were mixed. Production on the second season, which was ordered in November 2019, was moved to the United Kingdom.

Episodes

Cast and characters

Production

Development 
Amazon acquired the global television rights for J. R. R. Tolkien's The Lord of the Rings in November 2017. The company's streaming service, Amazon Prime Video, gave a multi-season commitment to a series based on the novel and its appendices, to be produced by Amazon Studios in association with New Line Cinema and in consultation with the Tolkien Estate.

In April 2018, The Lord of the Rings and The Hobbit film director Peter Jackson had begun discussing his potential involvement with Amazon, but by June he was not expected to be involved in the series. Later that month, Head of Amazon Studios Jennifer Salke said discussions regarding Jackson's involvement were ongoing, and added that the deal for the series had only been officially completed a month earlier. The studio had been meeting with potential writers about the project and hoped that it would be ready to debut in 2021. Amazon hired J. D. Payne and Patrick McKay to develop the series in July. The pair were an unlikely choice, having only done unproduced or uncredited writing before the series, but their vision for the project aligned with Amazon's and they were championed to the studio by director J. J. Abrams who had worked with them on an unproduced Star Trek film. In December, Jackson said he and his producing partners would read some scripts for the series and offer notes on them, but otherwise he would enjoy watching a Tolkien adaptation that he did not make.

Bryan Cogman joined the series as a consultant in May 2019 after signing an overall deal with Amazon. Cogman previously served as a writer on Game of Thrones, and was set to work alongside Payne and McKay in developing the new series. In July, J. A. Bayona was hired to direct the first two episodes and serve as executive producer alongside his producing partner Belén Atienza. Later that month, Game of Thrones creators David Benioff and D. B. Weiss were in discussions with several outlets regarding signing an overall deal, including with Amazon who were interested in having the pair consult on The Lord of the Rings; they ultimately signed a deal with Netflix instead. At the end of July, Amazon announced that Payne and McKay would serve as showrunners and executive producers for the series, and revealed the full creative team that was working on the project: executive producers Bayona, Atienza, Bruce Richmond, Gene Kelly, Lindsey Weber, and Sharon Tal Yguado; visual effects producer Ron Ames; costume designer Kate Hawley; production designer Rick Heinrichs; visual effects supervisor Jason Smith; and illustrator/concept artist John Howe, who was one of the main conceptual designers on the films. Special effects company Wētā Workshop and visual effects vendor Wētā FX were also expected to be involved like they were for the films. Additionally, Tolkien scholar Tom Shippey was revealed to be working on the series, and he stated that he believed the first season was supposed to consist of 20 episodes.

In January 2020, Amazon announced that the first season would consist of eight episodes. Shippey was no longer involved by that April, and was believed to have left the project after publicly revealing information about it without permission. Other Tolkien scholars and "lore experts" remained onboard the series. Heinrichs was eventually replaced as production designer by Ramsey Avery, while Yguado left the series when she exited her role as Amazon Studios' head of genre programming. Cogman and Kelly also left the project following development of the season. Callum Greene joined as a new executive producer by December 2020 after previously serving as producer on Jackson's The Hobbit: The Desolation of Smaug (2013). In March 2021, Wayne Che Yip was announced as director for four episodes of the season, and was set as a co-executive producer. Charlotte Brändström was revealed as director for another two episodes in May. Prime Video announced the series' full title, The Lord of the Rings: The Rings of Power, in January 2022. That August, Jackson said he had not been contacted again about seeing scripts for the series. Amazon explained that the deal to acquire the television rights for The Lord of the Rings required them to keep the series distinct from Jackson's films, and the Tolkien Estate were reportedly against Jackson's involvement in the project. Despite this, the showrunners had privately discussed the series with Jackson and Yguado had championed his inclusion before her exit.

Writing 
A writers room for the season had begun work in Santa Monica by mid-February 2019. Salke described extensive security measures that were being taken to keep details of this writing secret, including windows being taped closed and a security guard requiring fingerprint clearance from those entering the room. In addition to Payne and McKay, writers on the season include Gennifer Hutchison, Helen Shang, Jason Cahill, Justin Doble, Bryan Cogman, and Stephany Folsom, with Glenise Mullins acting as a consulting writer. The writers room was set to be disbanded once production on the season began.

The series is set in the Second Age of Middle-earth, thousands of years before the events of The Hobbit and The Lord of the Rings. It covers all of the major events of the Second Age, though it condenses these into a short time period rather than taking place over thousands of years. This allowed major characters from later in the timeline to be introduced in the first season. McKay said the season was about "reintroducing this world and the return of evil", focusing on introducing the Second Age and its heroic characters rather than telling a "villain-centric" story. The season features several locations not previously seen in the film adaptations, including the Elf-capital Lindon, the island kingdom of Númenor, and the northernmost wastes of Forodwaith. It also revisits familiar locations from the films, such as the Dwarf realm of Khazad-dûm which is in ruins during the Lord of the Rings films but is shown in its "full glory" during the series. Similarly, the dark land of Mordor is introduced as a beautiful land that is decimated when Orcs cause the first eruption of Mount Doom. Payne and McKay hoped audiences would be surprised by the reveal that "The Southlands" are actually Mordor, and were inspired for this new origin story by Tolkien's passion for environmentalism and criticisms of industrialization.

The showrunners felt the Dark Lord Sauron's deception of the Elves was a key element in Tolkien's writings and wanted to preserve that experience for the audience, including those who knew the lore already, so they chose to create a new identity for the character which is kept a mystery for much of the season. However, they did make a references to Sauron's "Lord of Gifts" disguise from the source material. Taking inspiration from a line in The Lord of the Rings where the character Galadriel says "I know [Sauron's] mind, and he gropes ever to know mine", they wanted to use this new identity to explore a meeting between the two characters. This led to the new human character Halbrand, who grows close with Galadriel until his true identity is revealed at the end of the season. Halbrand's first line of dialogue is a line that Galadriel later says in The Lord of the Rings: "The tides of fate are flowing. Yours may be heading out." The rest of his dialogue, including "Looks can be deceiving", was designed to have added meaning and make the audience question whether it is the truth or a manipulation from Sauron.

While Tolkien wrote that the three Rings of Power for the Elves were created after the rings for Men and Dwarves, the season ends with the Elven rings being created first. The showrunners said the rings for Men and Dwarves would be created in future seasons. Wanting to elaborate on the special power of the rings, they combined several different elements from Tolkien's writings for their creation. One of the Elven rings contains the ore mithril, and they suggested that it was an important element of all the Elven rings and introduced the idea that mithril comes from the Silmarils, powerful jewels from the First Age. This is able to counteract the fading power of the Elves in the series. The creation of mithril from the Silmarils is recited with the title "The Song of the Roots of Hithaeglir", which is labeled as being potentially apocryphal to give the series "a little bit of wiggle room" with those who disagreed with the change from Tolkien's works. The piece of mithril used for the rings represents the character Elrond's journey in the season and his friendship with the Dwarf Durin. The rings also contain metal from Galadriel's dagger, which represents her brother and her hunt for Sauron. McKay said these two elements added an "emotional grounding" to the creation of the rings and symbolized the end of their character arcs.

Payne and McKay believed the series would not truly feel like Middle-earth to the audience without Hobbits and Wizards. Tolkien's writings state that the Hobbits were not known during the Second Age, so they chose to explore another group he wrote about called the Harfoots, who are precursors to the Hobbits. The Harfoots have a secretive society and live in the "margins of the bigger quests" similarly to the play Rosencrantz and Guildenstern Are Dead. The Wizards are also primarily associated with the later Third Age, but one version of Tolkien's history has the two Blue Wizards arrive in Middle-earth during the Second Age. The showrunners used this as the basis for their own Wizard, "The Stranger", allowing them to have a "Tolkienian relationship" between a Wizard and a halfling similar to the characters Gandalf and Frodo Baggins in The Lord of the Rings.

Location 
Salke said in June 2018 that the series could be produced in New Zealand, where the films were made, but Amazon was also willing to shoot in other countries as long as they could "provide those locations in a really authentic way, because we want it to look incredible". Pre-production on the series reportedly began around that time in Auckland, while location scouting also took place in Scotland, including around the Isle of Skye, Portpatrick, Scourie, Perthshire, and Loch Lomond. Amazon and Creative Scotland held talks about the series being based at new studios that were under construction in Leith, Edinburgh. In December, Amazon held a "crisis meeting" with David Parker, then New Zealand's Minister of Economic Development, after the studio threatened to take the production out of the country due to the lack of available studio space in Auckland. New Zealand's Major Screen Production Grant, which provides tax rebates for productions, was offered to Amazon, but Parker did not propose any special deal because he wanted the series to be made "on terms that are good for New Zealand".

Amazon eventually decided to film in New Zealand, and were reportedly influenced by the New Zealand government's reassurances that the country was safe following the Christchurch mosque shootings in March 2019, as well as concern regarding the potential effects of Brexit in Scotland. Production was set to primarily take place in Auckland, but additional filming was expected to take place in Queenstown and other locations around New Zealand. Auckland was chosen as the primary filming location because the Wellington studios that the films were produced in were being used by the Avatar films at the time. Leases for the series at Kumeu Film Studios and Auckland Film Studios took effect in July 2019, and Amazon officially confirmed that the series would be filmed in New Zealand that September after completing negotiations with the New Zealand Government, the New Zealand Film Commission, and Auckland Tourism, Events and Economic Development (ATEED). The studio said filming would begin in the "coming months" and some specific locations were still being discussed with ATEED. Payne and McKay said the creative team chose New Zealand because they needed "somewhere majestic, with pristine coasts, forests, and mountains" that could also meet the production requirements of the series.

Through New Zealand's Major Screen Production Grant all film and television productions receive a 20 per cent tax rebate, and projects that offer "significant economic benefits" can negotiate for an additional 5 per cent. Amazon signed two Memoranda of Understanding in December 2020 with the New Zealand Film Commission, Tourism New Zealand, and the country's Ministry of Business, Innovation and Employment (MBIE) to gain access to the additional amount. One memorandum outlined Amazon's overall obligations in exchange for the extra refund, and the other was specific to the first season. Further memoranda needed to be signed for future seasons. The agreements allowed Tourism New Zealand to promote the country using material from the series, while Amazon would work with the Film Commission to help grow the country's screen sector and with MBIE to run an "innovation program" to benefit New Zealand companies and research groups. James Hibberd at The Hollywood Reporter noted that the  amount "almost certainly" included additional costs to the season's production budget, including the startup costs of building sets, costumes, and props that would be used in future seasons as well. Salke confirmed this, describing the cost as a "crazy headline that's fun to click on, but that is really building the infrastructure of what will sustain the whole series".

38 filming locations were chosen for the season. 15 were in Auckland, and the others included the Hauraki Gulf, the Coromandel Peninsula, the Denize Bluffs in the King Country, Mount Kidd in Fiordland, Piha, Rangitikei, Kahurangi National Park, Central Otago, and Queenstown. Unlike the films, the series used New Zealand's coastlines, including an unnamed beach in the South Island that was only accessible by boat or helicopter. This was used for the entrance to Númenor's harbor because it had surrounding rock formations that matched with concept art of "King Stones" at the entrance to the harbor. The showrunners intended to film in the Waitomo Caves for scenes set in the city of Khazad-dûm, but this proved to be impractical. More than 1,000 New Zealanders were contracted for the season and around 700 more were indirectly engaged by it. In August 2021, Amazon announced that it was moving production of future seasons to the United Kingdom and would not preserve the terms of the memoranda. Multiple factors played a role in the change, including the Tolkien Estate wanting the series to be filmed in the UK.

Casting 
Salke stated in June 2018 that though the series would not be a remake of the films, it would bring back some characters from them. By July 2019, casting was taking place around the world, including in the United States, the United Kingdom, and Australia. Casting for extras also began in New Zealand at that time. Markella Kavenagh was in talks at the end of July to portray a leading character referred to as "Tyra". Will Poulter was cast as another lead, reportedly called "Beldor", in September. The role was described as "one of the more coveted jobs" for young actors in Hollywood. Maxim Baldry was informally attached to the series in a "significant role" in mid-October, and Joseph Mawle was cast later that month. Mawle was reportedly playing the series' lead villain, who was referred to as "Oren". In December, Ema Horvath was cast in another lead role; Poulter was forced to leave the series due to scheduling conflicts; and Morfydd Clark was cast as a young version of the character Galadriel, who was portrayed in the films by Cate Blanchett.

Robert Aramayo was cast in a lead role, replacing Poulter, in early January 2020. He was later revealed to be playing a young version of the character Elrond, who was portrayed by Hugo Weaving in the films. A week after Aramayo's casting, Amazon officially announced his involvement along with the casting of Owain Arthur, Nazanin Boniadi, Tom Budge, Clark, Ismael Cruz Córdova, Horvath, Kavenagh, Mawle, Tyroe Muhafidin, Sophia Nomvete, Megan Richards, Dylan Smith, Charlie Vickers, and Daniel Weyman. Amazon's co-head of television Vernon Sanders said there were still some key roles to be filled. One of these was confirmed to go to Baldry in March, when his deal was completed. He replaced Harry Sinclair as Isildur, who appeared in the films during flashbacks. In December 2020, Amazon announced 20 new cast members for the series: Cynthia Addai-Robinson, Baldry, newcomer Ian Blackburn, Kip Chapman, Anthony Crum, Maxine Cunliffe, Trystan Gravelle, Lenny Henry, Thusitha Jayasundera, Fabian McCallum, Simon Merrells, Geoff Morrell, Peter Mullan, Lloyd Owen, Augustus Prew, Peter Tait, Alex Tarrant, Leon Wadham, Benjamin Walker, and Sara Zwangobani. Owen and Walker portray Elendil and Gil-galad, who were briefly played by Peter McKenzie and Mark Ferguson in the films.

In March 2021, Budge announced that he had departed the series after filming several episodes. He explained that Amazon had reviewed the first episodes and decided to recast his character, who was reported to be Celebrimbor. Charles Edwards was cast to replace him as Celebrimbor in July, when Will Fletcher, Amelie Child-Villiers, and Beau Cassidy were also added to the season's cast. Logistical issues following the recasting of Celebrimbor led to a subplot between the character and the Dwarves being removed. Seven of the series' main actors were New Zealanders, and a third of the season's 124 speaking roles went to New Zealand actors. The rest of the cast came from Australia, Sri Lanka, the United Kingdom, and the United States, and they did not know who they were portraying in the series until they arrived in New Zealand for filming.

The secrecy surrounding the cast led to theories and speculation about who could be portraying Sauron. Some fans identified a character in a trailer that they thought could be Annatar, one of Sauron's disguises. Anson Boon was reported to be playing the character, but Weber stated that this was actually Bridie Sisson and she was playing another character from Rhûn. The season finale reveals that Vickers's Halbrand is Sauron in disguise. He learned this while filming the third episode, but had suspected his character's villainous role during auditions when he was asked to recite a monologue given by Satan in John Milton's poem Paradise Lost.

Design 
The series is not a direct continuation of the films, but the showrunners did not want it to "clash" with their designs. They took advantage of the experience that Howe and Hawley had from working on the films. Howe said the biggest difference between the films and series was the new locations. Avery's biggest challenge was making Middle-earth feel both familiar and new. He chose to build as many practical sets as possible, wanting the series to "feel real and honest... to make sure that the actors had a world that felt inhabitable". Payne said being on set "was like going to Middle-earth every day for work". Avery used different styles for each location, such as Lindon's "tree-like columns" which were inspired by Gothic architecture. He added "arboreal details" to reflect the Elves' love of nature. Khazad-dûm was designed to be "less severe" than the film version, using a "sensitivity toward the stone" rather than "harsh lines and gargantuan statues" to show the kingdom before the Dwarves "got greedy". Avery compared the large wheels on the Harfoot wagons to the round Hobbit doors seen in the films.

Payne, McKay, and Avery put a lot of focus on Númenor, which Payne explained was because "it's never been seen before. People have some ideas of what Elves look like or what Dwarves look like and what those kingdoms might look like. But Númenor was, in some ways, a blank canvas." They planned out the entire city, and made sure that this reflected Tolkien's description of it originally having Elvish influences but becoming more "Mannish" as it was developed. Tolkien also compared the city to Venice, so Avery took inspiration from that city and its connection to water. He used the color blue in a lot of the city's locations to emphasize the culture's relationship with water and sailing. Númenor's "looming marble structures" and "bold shapes, rich colors, and geometrical ornament[s]" were inspired by Ancient Greece, Ancient Egypt, and the rest of North Africa and the Middle East. The distinct shape of the sails on Númenórean ships were based on the ceremonial headwear worn by Gondorean kings, the descendants of Númenóreans, in the Third Age. Avery worked with experts to ensure the ships were still functional with the unique sails. The main Númenor set was almost  and was described as "an entire seaside city" with buildings, alleyways, shrines, graffiti, and a ship docked at the harbor inside a large water tank. There were additional sets for specific locations within the city. The sets were built with a lot of real materials that were cheaper to source in New Zealand than the "movie fakery typically used to save time and money on sets in Los Angeles". Avery's team also created a form of Roman concrete using seashells that they used in the alleyways to show some of the history of the city. To further help immerse the actors, Avery used real plants, fruits, and incense on set so the "smells were right". Yip described the Númenor sets as "breathtaking... we were there for weeks, but every day I'd notice a new detail".

Jamie Wilson was the head of prosthetics for the series after previously working on the film trilogies. He noted that there had been advancements in the technology available since the films were produced, including encapsulated silicone that looks much more like real skin than previous techniques. The prosthetics team also worked closely with the series' visual effects department for digital "tweaks" to the prosthetics. The showrunners were particularly interested in the series' depiction of Orcs and ensuring that practical effects were used where possible. Wilson explained that the Orcs in the series were intended to be "younger"-looking than those in the films, since these groups are just emerging from hiding. Because of this, the series' Orcs feature less battle-scars than those in the films and are also lighter-skinned with some skin conditions caused by new exposure to the sun.

Filming 

Table reads with the cast began in New Zealand by mid-January 2020, ahead of the start of filming in early February, under the working title Untitled Amazon Project or simply UAP. The production was based in Auckland, primarily at Kumeu Film Studios and Auckland Film Studios, as well as Kelly Park Film Studios. J. A. Bayona directed the first two episodes, and acknowledged the "massive expectations" for the series, especially following the "high bar" set by Jackson's films. Óscar Faura was the cinematographer for the two episodes after serving the same role on all of Bayona's previous films. As part of the production's approach to secrecy, actors were often stopped from entering sets that they did not have scenes in.

Location filming took place around Auckland in February. Filming for the first two episodes was expected to continue through May, followed by a longer-than-usual four or five month production break to allow the footage to be reviewed and so the writers could begin work on the second season. Production was set to resume in mid-October and continue until late June 2021. However, filming was placed on hold indefinitely in mid-March 2020, after 25 days of filming, due to the COVID-19 pandemic. Around 800 cast and crew members were told to stay home. Filming was allowed to resume in early May under new safety guidelines from the New Zealand government, when the majority of filming for the first two episodes was confirmed to have been completed. Instead of finishing the episodes then, the filming shutdown segued into the intended production break and the two episodes were set to be completed once filming on further episodes was ready to begin. The crew took advantage of the extended break in filming to refine the designs and scripts for the season, including adjusting the ending of the season to better align with the second-season storylines that the writers were working on. The series was one of seven film and television productions that were granted exemptions to allow cast and crew members to enter New Zealand while its borders were closed to non-New Zealanders due to COVID-19. The exemptions were granted before June 18 by then Minister of Economic Development Phil Twyford and applied to 93 members of the production as well as 20 family members. Around 10 percent of the series' crew were believed to be non-New Zealanders, and many of them had remained in the country during its pandemic lockdown and did not require exemptions. Pre-production for further episodes began by July 2020, and filming resumed on September 28.

Bayona completed filming by December 23. Production on further episodes was set to begin in January 2021 following a two-week Christmas break. Yip confirmed that he had begun filming by March, and Brändström was in New Zealand for production in May. Aaron Morton and Alex Disenhof were the cinematographers for their episodes. Walker said in June that he was unsure how much longer the cast was required to stay in New Zealand, saying the production's timeline was "a bit nebulous" and Amazon would "let us go when they're done with us"; many of the series' international cast members were unable to leave New Zealand during filming due to the country's restrictive pandemic-era border policies putting limits on who could leave and return, as well as requiring a two-week quarantine for anyone entering the country. This meant many actors were trapped in the country for nearly two years, and Boniadi said the cast "became a fellowship [who] were forced to lean on each other. We didn't have anybody else. We were on an island, away from our support systems, mid-pandemic." Addai-Robinson added, "We had to be there for each other in a way that is different from other on-location jobs. It really was about that protective bubble, and trying to focus on the task at hand." Other cast members helped Nomvete and her husband look after their newborn baby during filming. The closed border also meant Amazon executives could not monitor the production in-person. Filming wrapped on August 2, 2021.

Controversies 
In July 2021, several stunt performers alleged that a senior stunt supervisor for the production had created an "uneasy environment" that contributed to an unsafe workplace. At least three stunt performers were seriously injured on the set, including stuntwoman Dayna Grant who suffered a head injury in March and was diagnosed with a brain aneurysm and upper spinal injury; fans crowdfunded  to help Grant pay for surgery. Stuntwoman Elissa Cadwell was injured when she struck her head falling into a water tank while rehearsing a stunt in February 2020. Amazon notified New Zealand's workplace health and safety regulator WorkSafe a week later, when Caldwell was recovering from her injuries after being treated in hospital. Amazon paid Caldwell , in part to help her return home to Australia. Responding to the allegations, the production's head of safety Willy Heatley said the injury rate was 0.065 percent across the 16,200 days of stunt work since filming began, and this was mostly due to "common stunt-related sprains, bruises and muscle and soft tissue strains".

In November 2022, The Guardian reported on "serious concerns" that crew had regarding the production's environmental impact, and the impact of the industry in general. The team had promoted several sustainable practices, including recycling office paper waste and batteries, installing an electric vehicle charging station at each studio, distributing reusable water bottles, promoting vegetarian meals, and working with local waste disposal companies to recycle  of waste, but they felt their role was "largely diagnostic" and would contribute to a better sustainability approach for the second season more than the first. In response to The Guardian story, an Amazon Studios spokesperson said the studio's sustainability practices "either met or exceeded industry standards" and complied with New Zealand's environmental laws and regulations.

Visual effects 
When filming ended in August 2021, post-production was expected to continue in New Zealand until June 2022. Company 3 created a post-production environment in the cloud that all work and assets for the series went through, allowing producer Ron Ames to manage all of post-production remotely. This became a necessity during the pandemic. In addition to Wētā FX, visual effects were created by Industrial Light & Magic (ILM), Rodeo FX, Method Studios, DNEG, Rising Sun Pictures, Cause and FX, Cantina Creative, Atomic Arts, and Outpost VFX. 1,500 visual effects artists worked on the season, which has more than 9,500 visual effects shots. Ames said the effects were completed to a theatrical resolution so they could be shown on screens ranging from televisions to IMAX. The different vendors were overseen by visual effects supervisor Jason Smith.

To portray the Dwarf and Harfoot characters as being smaller than the rest of the characters, the production investigated using digital effects to avoid the costs of hiring scale double actors and making multiple versions of props and costumes. After realizing that this would not be possible, they ended up using a combination of different techniques such as oversized props and prosthetics, actors looking over the heads of their scene partners, forced perspective shots, and other editing tricks. The visual effects team developed a new system for motion control photography that allowed shots to be filmed multiple times at different scales while replicating the movement of hand-held cameras. Smith had a list of "Ten Commandments" for approaching these sequences, including one about combining different techniques to keep the audience guessing how the effects were being achieved. Ames said they tried to have cast members looking at each other whenever possible to prioritize the performances. Weber said the technical requirements for scenes combining actors at different scales made them some of the most complicated to create.

Ames said they considered using ILM's StageCraft technology to film scenes in front of digital backgrounds displayed on LED walls but decided against it because the technology would not work well for the series' expansive sequences and would take away from the grounded approach they were taking to try align with Jackson's naturalistic style for the films. Instead, the series was primarily filmed on locations and sets, though the visual effects team did extensive digital augmentation and extension of the environments. For instance, Ames compared the sets that Avery built for Númenor to the Fisherman's Wharf neighborhood in San Francisco and said the visual effects team had to create the rest of the city. These digital backgrounds were still made available in real-time on set for the cinematographers and camera operators to be able to see what needed to be in each shot. A recurring environment effect for the season is the ocean, seen when Galadriel is in the Sundering Seas in the second episode and later when the ships of Númenor are sailing. ILM handled these sequences, combining digital water simulations with aerial photography from New Zealand's coastline and footage from water tanks. The digital environment of Khazad-dûm was based on scans taken inside the Lost World Caverns.

Cantina Creative, who Smith previously worked with for on-screen titles and digital displays, were hired to create the transitions between locations which use a map of Tolkien's world. The artwork for the map was drawn by artist Daniel Reeve, who created the maps for Jackson's films, and translated onto a digital model by Cantina. The model was designed to look like it is made of aged leather, and the company went to Wayne Christensen's leathercraft shop in San Fernando Valley to take macro photography of real leather for reference. Cantina artists used hand-controlled tools to add displacement, weathering, bumps, and scratches to the map to make it feel like it was handmade. The camera moves for each transition were filmed for real on a life-size representation of the map using a motion control system that then translated the camera movements onto the digital map.

Cause and FX were hired to do temporary effects work on more than 700 shots during the editing process. When final visual effects work began, the company contributed to set extensions, scale shots, augmenting props and prosthetics, and were responsible for the final scene of the season in which Sauron enters Mordor. Rodeo handled much of the Harfoot storyline, including environment extension and augmentation, scale work, and fire and magic related to the stranger and the mystics. Outpost was responsible for the forging of the rings in the final episode, creating the molten metal and other elements needed for the 20-shot sequence.

Music 

Musicians Plan 9—Janet Roddick, David Donaldson, and Steve Roche—and David Long returned from the films to provide music during filming. They wrote the melody for the song "This Wandering Day", with lyrics by showrunner J. D. Payne, which is sung by actress Megan Richards during the episode "Partings".

Composer Bear McCreary was contractually prohibited from quoting any themes that Howard Shore wrote for the films, but he wanted to stay true to Shore's approach by preserving the core sounds and styles of music for each culture that Shore had developed, creating a "continuity of concept" with Shore's music. McCreary typically composes three or four themes or leitmotifs for a project, but needed more than 15 for The Rings of Power. He began working on the music in July 2021, starting with "an absolutely brutal six weeks" just composing the themes. He wrote an "anthem" for each culture and then created individual character themes that either aligned with the culture's music or did not, depending on the characterization. McCreary dedicated most of his time for the next eight months to composing the full nine-hour score for the season. 

Recording for the score began in November 2021, and each episode used a 90-piece orchestra at either Abbey Road Studios or AIR Studios in London over four days, a 40-person choir and children's choir at Synchron Stage in Vienna over three or fours days, and soloists on various specialty instruments in Los Angeles, New York, Norway, and Sweden over seven days. Those specialty instruments included Scottish bagpipes and Irish uilleann pipes, bodhrán drums, and penny whistles for the Harfoots; the Nordic hardanger fiddle and nyckelharpa for the Southlands; Middle Eastern frame drums, Indian dhol drums, Armenian duduk woodwinds, and a Turkish yaylı tambur string instrument for Númenor; and conch shells, antlers, femur flutes, and Aztec death whistles for the Orcs. The choral music used words from Tolkien's fictional languages: the Elvish languages Quenya and Sindarin, the Dwarvish language Khuzdul, the dark language Black Speech, and the Númenórean language Adûnaic. Payne reviewed all of the text in the score to ensure each fictional language was used correctly.

McCreary supervised the various recording sessions remotely while continuing to compose the score, but was able to conduct the orchestra for the final episode himself in April 2022. Two singles from McCreary's score, "Galadriel" and "Sauron", were released on Amazon Music on July 21, 2022. They were followed by a full soundtrack album featuring the series' main title theme (composed by Shore) and selections from McCreary's score. The album was released on all major streaming services on August 19 and was physically released by Mondo on CD (October 14) and vinyl (January 13, 2023). The Amazon Music version of the album includes two exclusive tracks. A version of the song "Where the Shadows Lie", which McCreary wrote as a theme for the score, is heard during the end credits of the first-season finale featuring singer Fiona Apple. It was added to the season's soundtrack album after the episode's release. Additional albums featuring the full score for each episode were also released. All music composed by Bear McCreary, except where noted:

Marketing 
The marketing campaign was overseen by executive Sue Kroll, and began in January 2022 with a title announcement video in which the letters of the title are physically cast from molten metal. 23 "character posters" were released on February 3, though unusually they do not feature actor or character names and focus on the hands and torsos of the characters rather than their faces. Amazon said this was to "fuel fan speculation and discussion", and it did lead to speculation and analysis about who each character could be. A first look at some of the main characters was revealed on February 10, along with early details about the story.

The first teaser trailer was released on February 13 during Super Bowl LVI. Tolkien fan website TheOneRing.net hosted an official "watch party" for the trailer on YouTube, while some high-profile fans were flown to Bellver Castle in the Balearic Islands, Spain, to help promote the teaser globally. Commentators said it did not reveal many new details about the series, but Graeme Guttmann of Screen Rant felt it did not hold back on "epic" spectacle. The Hollywood Reporter James Hibberd also described the teaser as epic, and felt it showed off the series' large budget, while Susana Polo at Polygon said it "wastes no time reintroducing viewers to the lush fantasy setting many know" from Jackson's film adaptations. Writing for IGN, Amelia Emberwing said the most successful aspect of the teaser was that "it  like The Lord of the Rings" and appeared to balance the "serenity and dangers of Middle-earth" like the films did. In contrast, Jack Butler of National Review had felt the first look images were "Tolkienesque" but was less sure about the teaser, which led him to think that the series would be more reliant on visual effects than the "grounded approach" of Jackson's films. Kevin E G Perry of The Independent was even more critical of the visual effects, saying the trailer looked "cheap" and like a "cut scene from an old Final Fantasy computer game". RelishMix reported that the teaser trailer had 80.34 million views in 24 hours across Facebook, Twitter, YouTube, and Instagram, which was the third highest among those airing during the Super Bowl according to their metrics. Amazon reported 257 million views within 24 hours, which they said was a record for any film or television trailer released during a Super Bowl broadcast.

The early marketing material led to a "cacophony" of online fan discourse, including concerns about accuracy to the source material and the series' compression of Tolkien's Second Age timeline. Discussing these responses for The Escapist, Darren Mooney said "extreme reactions" from online media fans were now expected due to cultural forces, "an entire online economy running on manufactured outrage", and the "near-religious reverence" that modern fans have for media. He said the online reaction was likely not representative of general opinions on the series and noted that Jackson's films, which were "beloved by mainstream audiences", faced similar complaints from Tolkien fans. In response to the fan concerns, Amazon invited several Tolkien critics, fan websites, and influencers to a screening in May 2022. They were flown to Merton College, Oxford, where Tolkien worked as a professor, and shown 20 minutes of completed footage from the series. They also talked to the showrunners and Howe. Justin Sewell of TheOneRing.net said they were unable to discuss details, but the footage "looks like it should, sounds like it should, and feels like a return to the comfortable universe we all love", addressing the concerns of most of the fans in attendance. Kaitlyn Facista, writing for the Tea with Tolkien blog, said the footage immersed her in Middle-earth in a way that the teaser trailer did not, and she was impressed by the showrunners' knowledge of the source material. Others reported that the screening and discussion with the showrunners made them "cautiously optimistic" about the series. Corey Olsen, an academic and podcaster known as the "Tolkien Professor", felt after meeting the showrunners that the series was in " good hands".

An "exclusive sneak peek" was made available to Amazon Prime members for 48 hours on July 6, before being widely released online, ahead of "Amazon Prime Day" on July 12 to 13. This was followed by a second teaser trailer on July 14 which Hibberd described as "a more extensive look at the show's rendition of Middle-earth". Cydney Contreras at E! Online said the teaser's locations were awe-inspiring and breathtaking, Jim Vorel of Paste said it was "visually splendid", and Gizmodo Germain Lussier said it felt like fans of Middle-earth were "going home". Adam B. Vary and Wilson Chapman at Variety acknowledged the locations and visuals, but felt the teaser did not explain the story for audience members who were unaware of Tolkien's writings. Writing for Forbes, Scott Mendelson said the teaser was not connected enough to the Lord of the Rings films' cast and story to entice general audiences, putting it on par with other fantasy properties inspired by the films that were not successful. Blake Hawkins at Comic Book Resources felt the teaser's inclusion of more Tolkien mythology and lore would help assuage the concerns of Tolkien fans, but TechRadar Matt Evans said it was unlikely to win them over. He explained that many fans had accepted the changes Jackson made to adapt The Lord of the Rings, but the same could not be said for his Hobbit films. Evans felt The Rings of Power would be treated similarly to the Hobbit films due to it being a "blockbuster ploy to keep our money" which was "the absolute antithesis of Tolkien's work". He added, "being a good fantasy show on its own merit is simply not going to be enough. It has to be truly great to justify its own existence".

The series was promoted at the San Diego Comic-Con in late July with a "meticulously choreographed" presence that included a meet-and-greet between cast members and Tolkien fans; a private dinner with cast, crew, Amazon executives, and media; branding on San Diego trains and the convention's entrances; and a two-hour panel moderated by television host and avid Tolkien fan Stephen Colbert, who was flown in for the day as a surprise for attendees. The panel began with McCreary conducting a 25-piece orchestra and 16-person choir, performing a suite of his original score. A full trailer and five clips were shown, and Colbert interviewed the cast and crew. Kroll said the convention was "our first real opportunity to show fans our dedication" to the source material and earn their engagement. Several outlets included the series on lists of "winners" at the convention, including TheWrap whose staff said Amazon "took the exact right approach" to its Comic-Con presence. For IGN list, Adam Bankhurst said the panel "changed the conversation" and created positive "buzz" in a way that the teaser trailers did not. The trailer from the panel was also released online, and Vary noted that it explained the series' premise, unlike the teasers. He and several other commentators highlighted the appearance of a Balrog. James Whitbrook at Gizmodo said there was a lot going on in the trailer and the series was "looking quite fantastic", while Jack Shepherd of GamesRadar+ said the trailer was the best look yet at the series.

A final trailer for the first season was released in late August, during the week before the series premiere. Multiple commentators pointed out that the trailer came following the premiere of rival fantasy series and Game of Thrones spin-off House of the Dragon, and some suggested that this was a way to remind audiences that The Rings of Power would be premiering soon as well. Also that week, Prime Video announced a promotion with Samsung that would see 8K footage from the series displayed on large LED screens at the "Samsung 837" experience center and Time's Square in New York City, Piccadilly Circus in London, and Piazza del Duomo in Milan.

Release 
The first two episodes were screened at premiere events in August 2022, in Los Angeles, Mexico City, Mumbai, New York City, and London. They were also shown in free fan screenings on August 31 in around 200 countries, including the U.S., Canada, the UK, Ireland, Argentina, Colombia, Australia, and New Zealand. The episodes premiered on Prime Video in the U.S. on September 1. The other six episodes were released weekly from September 9 to October 14. Episodes were released on Prime Video around the world at the same time as the U.S. release, in more than 240 countries and territories.

Reception

Viewership 
Amazon announced that The Rings of Power had been watched by 25 million viewers globally in the first 24 hours that the first two episodes were available on Prime Video. The company said this was the biggest premiere ever for the service. It was the first time that Amazon had publicly stated viewership data for Prime Video and the company did not specify how much of an episode a user needed to watch to count as a viewer. Salke said at the end of September 2022 that the series had been watched by nearly 100 million customers, and, a month later, Amazon said the series had driven "more [Prime Video] signs-up globally than any other Amazon original" series. In December, Sanders said the series had surpassed 100 million viewers globally and was Prime Video's most watched series ever. He added that there was a surge of new viewers starting the series after all of the episodes were released, and there had also been spikes in the sales of Tolkien's books. He called the series "a tremendous success... as significant as our investment has been, it has more than paid off".

Analytics company Samba TV, which gathers viewership data from certain Smart TVs and content providers, reported that 1.8 million U.S. households watched the series' first episode within four days of its release. This dropped to 1.3 million for the second episode, indicating that roughly a quarter of the audience chose not to continue watching after the first. This was behind the premiere numbers for HBO Max's House of the Dragon (4.8 million), Netflix's Stranger Things season four (2.9 million), and Disney+'s Obi-Wan Kenobi (2.1 million) earlier in 2022. Whip Media, who track viewership data for the 21 million worldwide users of their TV Time app, calculated that for the week ending September 4, three days after The Rings of Power debut, it was the second-highest original streaming series for U.S. viewership behind Disney+'s She-Hulk: Attorney at Law. The company also stated that The Rings of Power had the fifth-highest debut, in terms of three-day viewership following the premiere, in TV Time's history and retained 87 percent of its premiere viewership during the second episode.

On Whip Media's weekly original streaming series chart, The Rings of Power dropped to third place for the next two weeks following the release of Netflix's Cobra Kai. It was at fifth place for the week ending September 25, and then returned to second place behind She-Hulk for the three weeks after that. The series finished in third place the week after the season finale was released. JustWatch, a guide to streaming content with access to data from more than 20 million users around the world, included The Rings of Power on its list of top 10 streaming series in the U.S. for the weeks ending September 11, September 18, and October 16. JustWatch also said the series was the second-most watched series of September and the fifth-most watched of 2022. Parrot Analytics determines audience "demand expressions" based on various data sources, including social media activity and comments on rating platforms. During the week ending September 9, the company calculated that for U.S. streaming series The Rings of Power was the fourth-most in demand. It remained in the top ten until the week ending October 28, peaking the week before that at second-most in demand with the release of the season finale. Parrot said the series was 43.4 times more in demand than the average series for the finale week.

Nielsen Media Research, who record streaming viewership on U.S. television screens, estimated that The Rings of Power was watched for 1.25 billion minutes during its first four days. This is around 12.6 million viewers, the most for any streaming series or film for the week ending September 4. The Rings of Power was the first Prime Video original series to top the list. It remained in the top four until the release of its finale in the week ending October 16, when the series was at second place with 1.1 billion minutes viewed. It dropped out of Nielsen's overall chart the next week, but remained at fifth place in the company's original streaming series chart. Nielsen estimated that the series was the 15th-most watched of 2022 with 9.4 billion minutes viewed. It was the second Prime Video series on the end of year list after The Boys (10.6 billion minutes over its three seasons).

Comparisons with House of the Dragon 
Before The Rings of Power premiered, it was widely compared to fellow fantasy series House of the Dragon by commentators asking which would "win". According to Whip Media, House of the Dragon had 20 percent more followers than The Rings of Power at the start of August 2022. Writing for Quartz later that month, Adario Strange compared Google Trends data for both series and found that there was low audience interest in both until July 2022, at which point House of the Dragon jumped up to "100 out of a possible 100 in terms of interest" while interest in The Rings of Power remained low.

Jennifer Maas at Variety felt a fair comparison between the series and House of the Dragon was not possible based on self-reported data from Amazon and HBO. Whip Media excluded House of the Dragon from its list of top original streaming series because it was being released on the television network HBO at the same time as it was streaming on HBO Max, and said House of the Dragon would have topped the list when The Rings of Power debuted if it was being included. Similarly, Nielsen's streaming chart excluded the HBO viewership for House of the Dragon. That company estimated The Rings of Power to have 60 percent more viewership than House of the Dragon for the week ending September 4, which included three days of viewership for The Rings of Power first two episodes and only a few hours of viewership for House of the Dragon third episode (in addition to viewership of its first two episodes from earlier weeks). Variety Selome Hailu said this "isn't an apples-to-apples comparison" but the "viewing window does primarily match up both series’ first two episodes".

Nielsen found The Rings of Power to have higher viewership than House of the Dragon six of the seven weeks that both released new episodes. They said 68 percent of House of the Dragon viewers were in the 18–49 age group while 71 percent of The Rings of Power were over 35. There was a 34 percent overlap in viewers between the two series. Steven Tweedie and Travis Clark of Business Insider felt The Rings of Power had been overshadowed by House of the Dragon, which was supported by Google Trends and social media data. They suggested that this was due to The Rings of Power older audience, which did not "drive online engagement" in the same way as House of the Dragon younger viewers. According to TorrentFreak, House of the Dragon was the most-pirated series of 2022 and The Rings of Power was the second-most.

The executive producers of The Rings of Power said they did not feel any competition with House of the Dragon, and Lindsey Weber said this had been "manufactured by the media for headlines". Payne and McKay noted that they were making the series for years before HBO scheduled House of the Dragon to debut just weeks earlier than The Rings of Power, which then began to dominate "the narrative about how it's received. But it was not at all part of the narrative in how our show was conceived. Hopefully, we're competing against ourselves." Amazon reportedly used House of the Dragon for comparisons and were concerned by its high viewership. Comparing the two series' performances for Vanity Fair, Natalie Jarvey felt there were "no losers here. Neither project flopped on arrival and both have weathered early criticism... Hollywood should be cheering on both shows".

Critical response 

The review aggregator website Rotten Tomatoes reported an 83% approval score for the season based on 475 reviews. The website's critical consensus reads, "It may not yet be the One Show to Rule Them All, but The Rings of Power enchants with its opulent presentation and deeply-felt rendering of Middle-earth." Metacritic, which uses a weighted average, assigned a score of 71 out of 100 based on reviews from 40 critics, indicating "generally favorable reviews".

The first two episodes received generally positive reviews from critics, with particular praise for its cinematography, visuals, and musical score and some criticism for its pacing and characterization. Kevin Perry from The Independent praised the series saying that it "rummages around in JRR Tolkien's 'The Lord of the Rings' appendices and comes up with gold". Darren Franich from Entertainment Weekly expressed a negative opinion, calling it "a special catastrophe of ruined potential, sacrificing a glorious universe's limitless possibilities at the altar of tried-and-true blockbuster desperation" while criticizing the characterization of Galadriel.

The critic Stuart Heritage, writing in The Guardian, described the series as "inept". He felt that it was in the main poorly acted because of inadequate direction, though he admired Morfydd Clark's performance. He found the score "syrupy", the lighting inappropriate, and the visual effects variable in quality despite the cost of the show.

Alan Sepinwall in Rolling Stone commented that one could wish the series would do more with less. There had, he wrote, been "memorable, powerful moments", as with the Harfoots, or the way it introduced Galadriel, or Durin's friendship with Elrond, or the battle between Men and Orcs before Mount Doom erupted. All the same, in his view the "mystery box plotting" about who would turn out to be Sauron was overblown and not really engaging. Sepinwall found both action and night sequences grossly overlit. He felt, too, that the show appeared uncertain whether it was trying to please Tolkien fans or newcomers.

While praising the overall production, Ed Power from The Irish Times and The Daily Telegraph was critical of the Harfoots' affected Irish accents and saw the characters as a depiction of offensive stereotypes of Irish people. Some other Irish critics and publications agreed, but there were also some who were less critical of this element.

Audience response 
A day after the series premiered, Amazon began holding reviews on Prime Video for 72 hours to ensure they were not coming from internet trolls. James Hibberd of The Hollywood Reporter found this unusual, but Amazon said the policy was introduced for all its series earlier in the year. The series had an audience rating on Rotten Tomatoes that was considerably lower than the critics rating, and Hibberd said this was partially due to review bombing by users who were posting "numerous negative reviews for [the series] due to its perceived cultural or political issues rather than its actual quality". However, Hibberd said the majority of negative reviews focused on other reasons such as the story, acting, and pacing. He felt the audience rating would increase if the series could "deliver consistent quality over time... [and] win people over" similarly to the concurrent Disney+ series She-Hulk: Attorney at Law. Average reviews on IMDb and Google were slightly higher than the Rotten Tomatoes audience score at that point, but were polarized: the majority of reviews were either the highest or lowest possible score.

Analysis company Brandwatch found 60 percent of online discussions about the series in the few days following its premiere to be negative. These mostly focused on slow pacing, poor writing and acting, reliance on visual effects, and differences from Tolkien's writings. The other 40 percent praised the series for promising plotlines, intriguing characters, "breathtaking" cinematography, and respect for Tolkien. Discussing this data for TechRadar, Tom Power said many of the negative responses were from Tolkien fans that likely did not want the series to be made in the first place, or more casual fans who had been influenced by that group's views. He attributed the positive responses to "TV aficionados" and other fans. Like Hibberd, he felt the negative group could be won over by future episodes. Cindy White at The A. V. Club described some of the fan discourse as "a fight between loyal [Tolkien] fans who simply want to preserve the integrity of the thing they love and a multinational corporation looking to cash in on that devotion", and Anthony Palomba, professor of business administration at the University of Virginia, also partially attributed the responses to "super diehard people" who did not necessarily reflect the views of general audiences. Shaun Gunner, the chair of the Tolkien Society, agreed that responses to the series away from social media were more nuanced. He stated that among members of the society, some loved the series, others were unsure, but "very few people are just writing it off... cautious optimism is probably where most people are at."

After the season was released, members of the cast said they had noticed a shift in the conversation about the series away from some of the more controversial aspects. Jon Ben-Asher of TheOneRing.net felt Amazon had built trust with the Tolkien fan base throughout the season and said his "little corner" of the community was loving the series; the website released a roundup of staff opinions on the series which were mostly positive, despite concerns with changes from Tolkien's works. To counter claims that the series had not generated positive social media conversations, Bradley Prom at Screen Rant highlighted various Twitter responses and memes from fans of the series following the finale's release. When asked about audience responses to the series, Sanders revealed that Amazon did a study with thousands of audience members, including fans of Tolkien's writings and the films, to get insight into their thoughts on each episode. He acknowledged that there were Tolkien fans who had major issues with the series and said "whenever you take on something that's so beloved, you're going to have probably a strong reaction for and have some people who just aren't on board" with it. Regardless, he and Amazon were confident in their approach due to having the endorsement of the Tolkien Estate.

Casting backlash 
Lenny Henry revealed in October 2021 that he and other people of color had been cast as Harfoots, which was explained with Tolkien's description of the Harfoots as being "browner of skin". Several non-white actors were also cast as Elves and Dwarves for the first time in the franchise. After this was revealed through announcements and promotional images, Amazon received backlash from social media users complaining about these casting decisions, including arguments that Tolkien's descriptions invariably portrayed Elves, Dwarves, and Hobbits as white and these castings were therefore disrespectful to his writings. The series' official social media accounts removed some of the comments which they deemed to be racist. The producers said they expected to receive some responses like this, but wanted to ensure the series reflected "what the world actually looks like" and felt this approach to casting would be closer to the spirit of the books. Executive producer Lindsey Weber stated, "Tolkien is for everyone. His stories are about his fictional races doing their best work when they leave the isolation of their own cultures and come together." Members of the cast praised this approach, including Henry. Cynthia Addai-Robinson reiterated Weber's comments, stating that Tolkien explores "people of different ethnicities, backgrounds, and walks of life all coming together for a common cause. For me personally, as a viewer, I would have the expectation that [the series] would reflect the real world, as well as the world as I aspire it to be."

The Escapist Darren Mooney described these responses as "the reactionary backlash accompanying any modern project with female characters or characters of color". Andrew Blair at Den of Geek and Sakeina Syed at The Walrus both discussed how the backlash was an example of the increasing racist and sexist complaints made by some online groups about media over the prior decade (such as the 2016 Ghostbusters reboot and the Star Wars sequel trilogy). On online forums and comment sections many members of these groups used the following quote which they incorrectly attributed to Tolkien: "Evil is not able to create anything new, it can only distort and destroy what has been invented or made by the forces of good." Blair felt this was "colossally lacking in self-awareness". Syed said some Tolkien fans were reluctant to critique the series in case they became associated with the backlash. TheGamer Ben Sledge compared the backlash to homophobic complaints about Ian McKellen's casting as Gandalf in the Lord of the Rings films. Sledge acknowledged the argument that Tolkien hoped to create a fictional history and mythology for Britain, but said the assumption that all people in Britain's history were white was not historically accurate and did not apply to a fantasy story; Dimitra Fimi, a lecturer in fantasy and children's literature and specialist on Tolkien at the University of Glasgow, wrote a piece with Mariana Rios Maldonado for The Conversation that concurred with Sledge in this view, discussing Britain's history of diversity, the freedom of adaptations to make changes where needed, and that Tolkien often did not discuss the biology of his characters. They said he did suggest the existence of dark-skinned Elves in drafts of The Silmarillion.

Discussion of the casting backlash continued after the series premiered, including in analysis of the alleged review bombing on websites such as Rotten Tomatoes, IMDb, and Google. Angus Dalton at The Sydney Morning Herald found that "many of the most-liked one-star Google reviews cite[d] the show's inclusion of black and brown actors". He discussed this with Helen Young, a lecturer of writing and literature at Deakin University as well as an editorial board member at the Journal of Tolkien Research, who suggested there was only a small group of fans expressing these views but they were being amplified by "far-right political activists". In early September 2022, Puerto Rican star Ismael Cruz Córdova said he had been receiving messages featuring "pure and vicious hate speech" for several years due to his casting as an Elf. Soon after this was revealed, Lord of the Rings film actors Elijah Wood, Billy Boyd, and Dominic Monaghan released a photo of themselves on social media wearing shirts featuring Human, Hobbit, and Elf ears with different skin tones along with the phrase "You are all welcome here" in Elvish. Their fellow cast member Sean Astin released his own photo wearing a hat with the same design. Clothing featuring the design was made available for purchase, with half of all proceeds going to a charity that supports people of color. The Rings of Power cast also released a joint statement using the hashtag #YouAreAllWelcomeHere which similarly denounced the racism that several of their members had faced. Later in September, Orlando Bloom, who portrayed the Elf Legolas in the Lord of the Rings and Hobbit film trilogies, posted a photo of himself with Córdova. He captioned it "mellon" which means "friend" in Elvish.

Accolades 
The series was named on multiple lists of best television series for 2022, including by Comic Book Resources (2nd), BuddyTV (8th), JoBlo.com (9th), Boston.com (10th), Inverse (10th), The Mary Sue (10th), and MovieWeb (16th), as well as by CBC News, Gizmodo, Lifehacker, Nerdist, New York Post, and Wired on unranked lists.

Companion media 
An official aftershow hosted by Deadline Hollywood Dominic Patten and Anthony D'Alessandro was revealed on September 3, 2022. Titled Deadline's Inside the Ring: LOTR: The Rings of Power, a new episode of the aftershow was released soon after each episode of The Rings of Power debuted on Prime Video. The aftershow features interviews with cast and crew as well as exclusive "footage and insights" for each episode. On October 7, The Official The Lord of the Rings: The Rings of Power Podcast was announced. Actress Felicia Day, who described herself as a "super fan of all things Tolkien", was set to host the podcast, and spent two months recording with the cast and crew while they were promoting the season around the world. The eight-episode podcast was released on Amazon Music on October 14. Day also interviewed cast members for a panel at New York Comic-Con, which was recorded and released as a bonus episode of the podcast on November 9. On November 21, a series of bonus segments called "The Making of The Rings of Power" were added to Prime Video's X-Ray feature (allowing viewers to learn additional information about the series while watching it). X-Ray executive Craig Muller said the segments were created from thousands of hours of behind-the-scenes footage.

References

External links 
 
 
 

2022 American television seasons
The Lord of the Rings: The Rings of Power